Scouting Antiano (Papiamento: Antillean Scouting) is the national Scouting organization of the former Netherlands Antilles. It serves 1,600 members in 25 Scout groups, 21 Scout groups on Curaçao, two on Sint Maarten, two on Bonaire, none on Saba and Sint Eustatius. Since 2016, Scouting Antiano is a full member World Organization of the Scout Movement. Until then, it was an associate member of the Interamerican Region of the World Organization of the Scout Movement.

History 

In 1997, two Scout associations, Antilliaanse Padvinders Vereniging (APV, Antillean Scout Association), and the Katholieke Verkenners Nederlandse Antillen (KVNA, the Catholic Scouts of the Netherlands Antilles) merged. On April 15, 2000, Aruba got its own organisation, Scouting Aruba. Scouting Antiano share their headquarters with the "Padvindstersvereniging van de Nederlandse Antillen" and other Netherlands Antillean youth organisations.

Structure 
Scouting Antiano primarily follows the Dutch system of Scouting.

The Scout Motto is Ser Prepara, Be Prepared in Papiamento, and Wees Paraat in Dutch.

On 27 February 2016, the World Scout Committee recognized Scouting Antiano as the National Scout Organization of the Curaçao and conferred it with Full WOSM Membership with voting rights. The membership certificate was presented to the organisation in the 41st World Scout Conference, which was conducted in Baku of Azerbaijan in 2017.

See also
 Scouting in Guadeloupe et Saint Martin (French Scouting on the divided island of Sint Maarten)
 Padvindstersvereniging van de Nederlandse Antillen (Girl Scouts)

References

External links 

World Organization of the Scout Movement member organizations
Scouting and Guiding in the Netherlands Antilles
Organizations established in 1997